Elaea or Elaia is the ancient name of a small stream of Boeotia rising in the Delos Mountains and emptying into Lake Copais near the temple of Apollo Tegyraios.

References
 Hazlitt, Classical Gazetteer, "Elaea"
 *Richard Talbert, Barrington Atlas of the Greek and Roman World,, p. 55

Landforms of Boeotia
Rivers of Greece
Landforms of Central Greece